Veikko Viljo Vilhelm Larkas (27 March 1909, in Helsinki – 1969) was a Finnish architect.  A native of Helsinki, he graduated from the Aalto University School of Science and Technology in 1938.  Larkas is particularly known for his designs for a number of churches throughout Finland, including the Pielisensuu Church.

Compilation of Churches designed by Larkas 
 Hoilola church (Joensuu), 1950
 Värtsilä church (Värtsilä), 1950
 Haukivuoren church (Mikkeli), 1951
 Enontekiö church (Enontekiö), 1952
 Kyyjärvi church (Kyyjärvi), 1953 
 Viinijärvi church (Liperi), 1953
 Veitsiluoto church (Kemi), 1957
 Kauhajoki church (Kauhajoki), 1958
 Pielisensuu church (Joensuu), 1960
 Kolari church (Kolari), 1965
 Valkeakoski church (Valkeakoski), 1969

References
Suomen korkeakoulu insinöörit ja arkkitehdit 1956. STS:n ja TFiF:n julkaisema matrikkeli, s. 428. Helsinki: Sanoma Oy, 1956. 
"Kirkon suunnittelija" (in Finnish)

External links

1909 births
1969 deaths
Architects from Helsinki
People from Uusimaa Province (Grand Duchy of Finland)
Aalto University alumni
20th-century Finnish architects